David Lauder Bell (born  in Warriston, Edinburgh) was a Scottish rugby union international and first-class cricketer.

Rugby union career

Amateur career

He played for Watsonians.

Provincial career

He was capped by Edinburgh District.

International career

He was capped by Scotland 'B' twice, both times against France 'B' in the period 1974–75.

Bell was capped for Scotland's national rugby union team four times, all during the 1975 Five Nations Championship.

Cricket career

At cricket he played three first-class matches for the Oxford University Cricket Club in 1971. He didn't reappear on the first-class scene until 1979 when he represented Scotland against Sri Lanka's touring side, in Glasgow. A right-handed batsman, Bell finished his cricket career with 234 runs at 24.40 from his seven matches, with a highest score of 63. That innings, his only half century, came while playing for Scotland against Ireland at Dublin in 1981.

Golf
Bell reached the final of the Lothians Boys Golf Championship in 1964, but according to Bell’s recollection, he came up against a young player called Bernard Gallacher who beat him 7 and 6 and would go on to have an extremely successful golf career. Bell returned to amateur Golf and in 2012, aged 63 and still playing off a handicap of 3, he had amateur successes at the Braids Hill Golf Course in Edinburgh.

See also
 List of Scottish cricket and rugby union players

References

Cricket
CricketArchive: David Bell
Cricinfo: David Bell

Rugby union
 Bath, Richard (ed.) The Scotland Rugby Miscellany (Vision Sports Publishing Ltd, 2007 )
 Godwin, Terry Complete Who's Who of International Rugby (Cassell, 1987)
 David Bell on scrum dot com

1949 births
Living people
Scottish cricketers
Alumni of the University of St Andrews
University of St Andrews RFC players
Oxford University cricketers
Scottish rugby union players
Cricketers from Edinburgh
Rugby union players from Edinburgh
Scotland international rugby union players
People educated at George Watson's College
Alumni of St Edmund Hall, Oxford
Watsonians RFC players
Edinburgh District (rugby union) players
Scotland 'B' international rugby union players
Oxford University RFC players